Martin Hasse (born 21 February 1970) is a German lightweight rower. He won a gold medal at the 2003 World Rowing Championships in Milan with the lightweight men's eight.

References

1970 births
Living people
German male rowers
World Rowing Championships medalists for Germany